Vaziri (Vazīri) is an Iranian surname derived from the word Vazir ‘minister’ (Vazīr) and may refer to:

People
 Ali-Naqi Vaziri (1887–1979), Iranian musicologist and composer
 Amir Vaziri (born 1979), Iranian footballer
 Kazem Vaziri Hamane, politician, minister
 Khosrow Vaziri (born 1942), Iranian wrestler known as The Iron Sheik
 Leila Vaziri (born 1985), American swimmer
 Mohsen Vaziri-Moghaddam (born 1924), Iranian artist, painter, and professor
 Qamar ol-Molouk Vaziri (1905–1959), Iranian vocalist and intellectual
 Shohreh Aghdashloo, (born Shohreh Vaziri-Tabar, 1952), actress
 Alireza Vaziri Rahimi, (born 1987), Art director / professor

Places in Iran
 Vaziri, Iran (disambiguation)